"Ruby Ruby" is a 2018 Indian Hindi language song from the album of Sanju, the soundtrack album of the film of the same name. The song's lyrics were written by Irshad Kamil, composed by A. R. Rahman and sung by Shashwat Singh,  Poorvi Koutish.The song's music video is pictured upon actor Ranbir Kapoor and actress Sonam Kapoor. The song was released on 13 June 2018, and the music video was released in YouTube on 27 June 2018.

The song was nominated at the Asian Film Awards for Best Original Music.

Background 
The song belongs to a completely different space and has the hints of pop in it.  The video of  Ruby Ruby depicts Sanju's 'quest for love as he lets his imagination run wild.

Song starts with Rahman's music, high bass over guitar tune, and then sanju (Ranbir Kapoor) says "Har drug addict koi na koi bahana khojta hai drugs wapas shuru karne ke liye, mera bahana Ruby thi" 
()

Critical reception 
Scroll.in: "Composed by AR Rahman, Ruby Ruby, the third single from Rajkumar Hirani’s Sanju, echoes the classic Taal  song Ramta Jogi in more ways than one – the heavy bass guitars, the languid but thumping beat, and the additional percussion reminiscent of Sivamani's most energetic works with the composer."
The Indian Express: "The song grows on the listener with repeat hearings which is the case with most Rahman songs. With these three songs, one can certainly gauge that the Sanju album will have a track for every mood."
Cinestan: "AR Rahman written all over it. The Ruby Ruby song has an entrancing rhythm that captures the wild, pulsing beats of an artist in search of his muse.'Ruby Ruby' sets the rhythm template with its combination of electric and bass guitars. The signature element sets up the slow, trance-like tempo of the song before Singh's husky vocals fade in. The song is hoisted on the back of some subtle and effective percussions that back up the trippy vocals. Koutish's voice brings in a haunting facet to the composition, contributing to the trance-like feel of the song."

Music video 
"Ruby Ruby" has achieved almost 100 million views on YouTube.

Video credits 
Song director – Karan Narvekar
Choreography – Stanley D'costa
Director of photography – S. Ravivarman
Screenplay – Rajkumar Hirani

Credits and prsonnel 
A.R. Rahman – producer, composer, songwriter and arrangement
Irshad Kamil – lyricist
Shashwat Singh – singer
Poorvi Koutish – singer
Keba Jeremiah – bass, guitar
Chris Jason – guitar
Raja & Kumar – rhythm and percussion
VJ Srinivasamurthy – Sunshine Orchestra conductor

Technical personnel
Additional programming: Ishaan Chhabra
Mixing: Ishaan Chhabra & Deepak P A mastered by Suresh Permal
Sound engineers at Panchathan Record Inn (Chennai): Suresh Permal, Ishaan Chhabra, Santhosh Dhayanidhi, TR Krishna Chetan, Karthik Sekaran, Jerry Vincent, Kumaran Sivamani, Kaashif Rafiq, Pawan Chilamkurthi
Sound engineers at AR Studios (Mumbai): R Nitish Kumar, Dilshaad Shaikh
Sound engineers at AM Studios (Chennai): S.Sivakumar, Pradeep Menon, Kannan Ganpat, Manoj
Musicians fixer: R Samidurai
Musician coordinators: Vijay Iyer, Noel James, TM Faizuddin, Abdul Haiyum

References 

2018 songs
Indian songs
Songs written for films
Hindi-language songs
Hindi film songs
Songs with music by A. R. Rahman